Frankelda's Book of Spooks (Spanish: Los Sustos Ocultos de Frankelda) is a Mexican stop motion animated television series created by brothers Arturo and Roy Ambriz Rendón and produced by the animation studio Cinema Fantasma for Cartoon Network Latin America and HBO Max.

Premise
Frankelda, a mysterious ghostwriter, tells tales of terror with the assistance of her grumpy enchanted book Herneval, primarily focused on children encountering supernatural entities such as gnomes, witches, sirens and the Coco collectively known as "Scares", that rely on human fear to survive. Trapped in the consciousness of a sentient haunted house for 150 years, telling stories allows the two an opportunity to gradually regain their strength and make an escape plan, though with the obstacle of the house itself waking up.

Characters 
 Frankelda (voiced by Mireya Mendoza), is the show's narrator. She is the energetic ghost of Francisca Imelda, an aspiring horror writer from 1870s Mexico. Growing up with a fondness for reading and writing scary stories, her passions were discouraged by her family and her manuscripts were rejected by sexist publishers, resulting in her taking on her pen name. She takes an offer from Herneval to become his new Royal Nightmare Writer, allowing her stories to find an audience in people's dreams, though her consciousness has to be separated from her body to make the trip to the realm of the Scares. However, with the journey turning into a one-way trip and the nature of dreams leaving her anonymous, she has become a literal ghostwriter.
 Herneval (voiced by Arturo Mercado Jr.) is Frankelda's cautious and grumpy enchanted book. Prior to taking on his current state, he was an owl-like creature that was the Prince of the Scare Kingdom. Admiring her work since the two were children, he makes a romantic offer for her to become the Scares' new nightmare writer. Herneval can make people sleep by touching them and can induce astral projection in humans.
 Procustes (voiced by Luis Leonardo Suarez) is a giant spider monster that was the previous Royal Nightmare Writer of the Scares. When his stories had become tired, cliche and less effective for creating the nightmares the kingdom needed, Herneval sought to replace him with Frankelda. In revenge he made sure Frankelda's consciousness would not leave the Scare realm, and through unknown circumstances, he has transformed into a living haunted house that has trapped Frankelda and Herneval within the walls of his mind.

Production 
Frankelda's Book of Spooks was initially pitched as a small web series with a four minute pilot episode being released in 2019 on the Cartoon Network YouTube channel, inspired by Tales from the Crypt and The Storyteller. When the series was backed by HBO Max as part of their larger initiative to develop 100 projects in Latin America, the Ambriz brothers expanded the scope of the project into something more dramatic with musical numbers. 122 puppets and 42 sets were created for the series.

While the series has yet to be released outside Latin America and a second season has yet to be greenlit, the series is being positioned as a "calling card" for Cinema Fantasma, with the Ambriz brothers describing Frankelda's extended backstory as offering enough depth as a hook for potential later seasons or a movie. A spinoff exploring the backstory of Herneval was announced at the Pixelatl 2022 festival, titled "Frankelda y el Príncipe de los Sustos".

Episodes

References

External links

2020s animated television series
2020s Mexican television series
Stop-motion animated television series
Mexican children's animated horror television series
HBO Max original programming